Marco Mocci (born 19 October 1982 in  Civitavecchia, Province of Rome) is an Italian racing driver. He has competed in Euroseries 3000 and International Formula Master.

References

External links
 
 

1982 births
Living people
People from Civitavecchia
Italian racing drivers
Italian Formula Renault 2.0 drivers
Italian Formula Three Championship drivers
Auto GP drivers
International Formula 3000 drivers
Sportspeople from the Metropolitan City of Rome Capital

Scuderia Coloni drivers